The following is a list of BYU Cougars men's basketball head coaches. There have been 19 head coaches of the Cougars in their 121-season history.

BYU's current head coach is Mark Pope. He was hired in April 2019 to replace Dave Rose, who retired after 14 seasons as the Cougars' head coach.

References

BYU

BYU Cougars men's basketball coaches